Greydon Clark (born February 7, 1943) is an American screenwriter, director, producer, and actor. His career spans several decades and genres, although the majority of his work has been low-budget productions in the action/horror genres. His most recent work was writing and directing the 1998 science fiction film Stargames.

Between 1969 and 1989, Clark acted in a series of action/horror films, including Satan's Sadists, The Mighty Gorga, Hell's Bloody Devils, Dracula vs. Frankenstein, and Psychic Killer. Beginning in 1973, he wrote and directed a series of films, including The Bad Bunch (in which he also starred), Black Shampoo, Satan's Cheerleaders, Hi-Riders, Angels Revenge, Uninvited, Dance Macabre, Skinheads, and Stargames. In 1980 he directed The Return and Without Warning.

In 2013, Clark released his autobiography, On the Cheap: My Life in Low Budget Filmmaking.

Filmography

Acting credits

References

External links

Shades of Greydon Clark : Cashiers du Cinemart

1943 births
American film directors
American film producers
Horror film directors
Living people